Dial M for Murder was a British TV crime drama, episode 12 of the third season of the series Sunday Night Theatre. It was aired on 23 March 1952.

The script was based on the eponymous play by Frederick Knott, which later was filmed by Alfred Hitchcock in 1954.

Cast
Elizabeth Sellars as Sheila Wendice
Basil Appleby as Max Halliday
Emrys Jones as Tony Wendice
Olaf Pooley as Captain Lesgate
Douglas Stewart as Lionel
Raymond Huntley as Inspector Hubbard
Robert Cawdron as Police Sergeant
Fletcher Lightfoot   
Lane Meddick
Graham Stuart
Adrian Wallet

External links

1952 British television episodes